Abu Nasr Farahi (Persian: ابونصر فراهی; died 1242) was a Persian poet and lexicographer from Farah, Sistan, which is now in Afghanistan. Little is known about his life; he is known to have lived during the rule of the Nasrid dynasty and the early period of the Mongol Empire.

Three works are attributed to him, including the Nisab al-Sibiyan, the first lexicographic work on Arabic to be written in Persian verses.

References

Sources 
 

13th-century Iranian people
1242 deaths
Year of birth unknown
People from Farah Province